Super Junior-K.R.Y. Japan Tour 2015: Phonograph is the first Japan arena tour of South Korean boyband Super Junior's first sub-unit, Super Junior-K.R.Y. The group held 11 concerts across Yokohama, Kobe, Fukuoka, and Nagoya and was attended by 90,000 fans. They performed over 24 songs including some of Super Junior's songs, original soundtracks, and songs from Japanese singers. The tour was in support of their 2nd Japanese single "Join Hands".

This tour marks the return of Yesung, who was discharged from mandatory military service in May 2015.

Summary 
On February 24, 2015, it was announced that Super Junior-KRY was to kick off their 2nd Japan tour, with Yesung rejoining Super Junior K.R.Y. after his military discharge. Ticket sales opened on April 17, 2015 in Yahoo Japan. Because of overwhelming response from fans, the tour concert then added two days more. The additional dates would be scheduled on 13 and 14 June and 2 July 2015, for which tickets went on sale on April 21, 2015.

For the first time Kyuhyun, Ryeowook and Yesung performed their newest single Join Hands in front of 26 thousand fans in Yokohama Arena.

Setlist

Tour dates

Discography

Personnel 
 Artists:Super Junior-K.R.Y (Yesung, Ryeowook, Kyuhyun)
 Tour organizer: SM Entertainment
 Tour promoter: Dream Makers

References

External links 
 Super Junior-K.R.Y. Website 

2015 concert tours
Super Junior-K.R.Y concert tours